The following is a list of clubs who have played in the Liga 1 (Indonesia)  since its formation in 2008 to the current season. All statistics here refer to time in the Liga 1 Indonesia only, with the exception of 'Most Recent Finish' (which refers to all levels of play) and 'Last Promotion' (which refers to the club's last promotion from the second tier of Indonesian football). Liga 1 Indonesia teams playing in the 2022–23 season are indicated in bold, while founding members of their Liga 1 Indonesia are shown in italics. If the longest spell is the current spell, this is shown in bold, and if the highest finish is that of the most recent season, then this is also shown in bold

Table

Liga 1 (Indonesia)